Braciolone is an Italian roulade meat dish consisting of braised beef, veal or pork that is filled with cheese, salami, hard-boiled eggs and breadcrumbs and then rolled. It is typically served topped with a tomato-based sauce.  Various additional ingredients can be used, such as garlic, parsley, walnuts and pork lard, among others. The hard-boiled eggs are sometimes placed in the center of the roll, which provides a "bull's-eye" appearance when the dish is sliced. It has been described as a large-sized braciola-style dish.

Braciolone is also a dish in Sicilian cuisine and the cuisine of the U.S. state of Louisiana.

See also

 Farsu magru
 List of beef dishes
 List of Italian dishes
 List of pork dishes
 List of rolled foods
 List of veal dishes

References

External links
 Barciolone. Siciliangirl.com.

Italian cuisine
Beef dishes
Veal dishes
Pork dishes